Maksym Volodymyrovych Tretyak (born 5 November 1984 in Vinnytsia) is a boxer from Ukraine.  Tretyak competed at the 2004 Summer Olympics in Athens, Greece and lost in the quarterfinals of the men's bantamweight division (– 54 kg) to bronze medalist Aghasi Mammadov.

Tretyak qualified for the Athens Games by finishing 2nd at the 1st AIBA European 2004 Olympic Qualifying Tournament in Plovdiv, Bulgaria, losing to Hungary's Zsolt Bedák.

References
 sports-reference

1984 births
Living people
Bantamweight boxers
Boxers at the 2004 Summer Olympics
Olympic boxers of Ukraine
Sportspeople from Vinnytsia
Ukrainian male boxers